Daniel Herberg (born 7 March 1974) is an internationally elite curler from Germany.

Daniel Herberg was born in Oberstdorf, West Germany. He has been selected as the Alternate for Team Germany at the 2010 Winter Olympics in Vancouver, British Columbia, Canada.

Herberg also competed at the 2002 Salt Lake City Olympics on the German team that placed sixth with a 4 - 5 record.

Herberg Is Employed As A Project Developer

Teammates 
2010 Vancouver Olympic Games

Andreas Kapp, Skip

Andreas Lang, Third

Holger Höhne, Second

Andreas Kempf, Lead

2002 Salt Lake City Olympic Games

Sebastian Stock, Skip

Stephan Knoll, Second

Markus Messenzehl, Lead

Patrick Hoffman, Alternate

References 

1. http://www.vancouver2010.com/olympic-curling/athletes/daniel-herberg_ath1013685Rv.html

External links
 

1974 births
Living people
German male curlers
Curlers at the 2002 Winter Olympics
Curlers at the 2010 Winter Olympics
Olympic curlers of Germany
European curling champions